Events from the year 1994 in Belgium

Incumbents
Monarch: Albert II
Prime Minister: Jean-Luc Dehaene

Events
 10 to 11 January – NATO summit in Brussels
 7 April – Murder of 10 Belgian peacekeepers at the beginning of the Rwandan genocide
 9 October – Provincial and municipal elections
 31 December – Switel Hotel fire in Antwerp

Publications
 Michel Biron, La modernité belge: littérature et société (Brussels: Éditions Labor; Montréal: Presses de l'Université de Montréal)
 H. Kinable, Drugsgebruikers en AIDS (Report on AIDS prevention among injecting drug users in Flanders)

Art and architecture
 Sint-Pieters-Leeuw Tower, tallest free-standing building in Belgium

Births
 25 July – Jordan Lukaku, footballer
 19 August – Nafissatou Thiam, athlete
 4 December – Leandro Trossard, footballer

Deaths
 1 April – Léon Degrelle (born 1906), Nazi collaborator
 20 July – Paul Delvaux (born 1897), painter
 26 November – Omer Vanaudenhove (born 1913), politician

References

 
Belgium
Years of the 20th century in Belgium
1990s in Belgium
Belgium